Amana River is a river of north-eastern Venezuela. It flows into the Gulf of Paria, via the Guanipa River.

See also
List of rivers of Venezuela

References
Rand McNally, The New International Atlas, 1993.

Rivers of Venezuela